Bernt Valter Ström (6 March 1940 in Säter, Sweden–31 August 2009 in Luleå, Sweden) was a Swedish actor.

Ström studied at Skara Skolscen and at NAMA in Stockholm. He was under a long time engaged at Norrbottensteatern.

Selected filmography
Badjävlar (1971)
Lasse liten (1974)
Bomsalva (1978)
Lyftet (1978)
Den enes död (1980)
 1983 – Profitörerna
Sommarens tolv månader (1988)
 1993 – The Man on the Balcony
Glädjekällan (1993)
 1993 – Murder at the Savoy
Roseanna (1993)
 1993 – The Fire Engine That Disappeared
Petri tårar (1995)

References

External links

1940 births
2009 deaths
Swedish male actors
People from Luleå